Anatoly Bobkov (born 7 February 1967) is a Russian luger. He competed in the men's doubles event at the 1994 Winter Olympics.

References

External links
 

1967 births
Living people
Russian male lugers
Olympic lugers of Russia
Lugers at the 1994 Winter Olympics
Place of birth missing (living people)